"Jesus Says" is a song by Ash, released as the first single from their album Nu-Clear Sounds on 21 September 1998, reaching number 15 in the UK singles chart. It was released as a single CD, a 7" vinyl, and as a cassette. "Jesus Says", despite its considerably low chart placing was Ash's highest ever selling single until "Shining Light" in 2001. The 7" version came with a picture sleeve and the UK promo version came in a custom rice paper picture wallet.

"Jesus Says" introduced the world to Ash's second full-length album, and left some fans baffled by its more raw sound. Nevertheless, it was a hit for the band and is considered somewhat of a fan favourite. Tim said of the song: 'This was written at the height of our touring madness'. It's about being hung over and homesick in New York City - 'a million light years from home'. The song may have also originally been called "Ditto". Tim Wheeler has stated the song has no religious meaning, although that did not stop some controversy being built over it. A promo poster showing a cartoon Jesus saying "Ash" was heavily criticised.

The song also appears on the "Intergalactic Sonic 7″s" hits collection, and live versions can be found on the "Tokyo Blitz" DVD and the "Numbskull" EP. Additionally, a remix of the song was recorded as a B-side for the "Shining Light" single. The Shining Light remix was also released as a white label 12".

The song was remixed for American release by Butch Vig. The song featured in the soundtrack for the film Swimfan.

B-sides
The B-side "Radiation" appeared on the CD 1 version of the single and was a definite indicator to the tone of the upcoming album.

"Dancing on the Moon" also appeared on the CD1 version. It was also Ash's first single to be released in 2CD formats. This caused unrest within the band who were unhappy to do B-sides purely just for chart reasons. Rick did not turn up for the recording session, so Danny Goffey of Supergrass recorded the drumming for this track instead.

"Taken Out" appears on the CD2 edition (as well as on the "Cosmic Debris" B-sides collection), and was the first track solely written and sung by newly employed guitarist, Charlotte Hatherley. Rick McMurray claims that it's one of his favourite songs to play.

Finally, "Heroin, Vodka, White Noise" (also on CD2) is a classic 'burn-out' song, which served as a more gentle, bitter-sweet contrast to the likes of "Jesus Says".

Music video
The video for "Jesus Says" was directed by Howard Greenhalgh. The majority of the video takes place in an abandoned warehouse where a party is taking place with the band playing. The video constantly rotates which led to MTV receiving complaints about the video due to its apparent 'nauseousness', which led to a second video to be released, with toned-down spinning effects.

Track listing
All tracks written and composed by Hamilton/Wheeler; except where indicated.

CD1
"Jesus Says"
"Radiation"
"Dancing On The Moon" (Hamilton)

CD2
"Jesus Says" - 4:47
"Taken Out" (Hatherley) - 2:53
"Heroin, Vodka, White Noise" - 5:52

7"
"Jesus Says (Album Version)"
"Taken Out" (Hatherley)

Promo CD
"Jesus Says (Album Version)"
"Jesus Says (Radio Edit)"

1998 singles
Ash (band) songs
Infectious Records singles
1998 songs
Music videos directed by Howard Greenhalgh
Songs written by Mark Hamilton (bassist)